David Munk is a Paralympic alpine sit skier from Australia.  He won bronze medals at the 1992 Albertville Games and 1994 Lillehammer Games.

He competed in two events at the 1988 Innsbruck Games. At the 1992 Albertville Games, he competed in three events and won a bronze medal in the Men's Super-G LW11. At his third Games, 1994 Lillehammer Games, he competed in four events and won a bronze medal in the Men's Giant Slalom LWXI. He was due to compete at the 1998 Nagano Games but a kidney infection forced him to withdraw.

References

Paralympic alpine skiers of Australia
Alpine skiers at the 1994 Winter Paralympics
Alpine skiers at the 1992 Winter Paralympics
Paralympic bronze medalists for Australia
Living people
Medalists at the 1992 Winter Paralympics
Medalists at the 1994 Winter Paralympics
Australian male alpine skiers
Year of birth missing (living people)
Paralympic medalists in alpine skiing